Walygator Grand-Est is an amusement park located in Maizières-les-Metz, Lorraine, France. Since its opening in 1989, the park has had a succession of different names: Big Bang Schtroumpf (Smurf), Walibi Schtroumpf, Walibi Lorraine and now Walygator Parc.

History
First designed within the extant halls of Sacilor's Laminoir by the Leisure division HHCP Architects in Maitland, Florida,  the theme park was named The New World of the Smurfs, or Le Nouveau Monde des Schtroumpfs. After a decision was made to abandon the mill, the park was re-designed by Grady Larkins and eventually opened up on May 9, 1989, as Big Bang Schtroumpf. Built on the site of the former steel mills of Sacilor, the park was then managed by Sorépark, a company headed by Pierre Jullien. Construction costs topped .

 In 1991, the park, on the verge of bankruptcy, is taken over by Walibi Group. Walibi's orange kangaroo mascot is brought alongside Peyo's little blue men: Walibi Schtroumpf was born.
 In 1998, parent Walibi Group is bought out by Premier Parks. At this point, the land on which Walibi Schtroumpf sits, totals 162 hectares of which only 42 are in use.
 In 2003, Walibi Schtroumpf becomes Walibi Lorraine and the Smurfs characters are removed from the park.
 In 2004 Six Flags (Premier Parks' successor), which had ownership of the park since 1998, divests itself of its European operations (apart from Warner Bros. Movie World Madrid, which was sold back to Time Warner and renamed Parque Warner Madrid in 2006). The park changes hands to Star Parks, of London-based Palamon Partners.
 In 2006 Star Parks, in turn,  sells the park to brothers Claude and Didier Le Douarin. Around the same time, the Walibi brand is sold to French leisure giant Compagnie des Alpes. The new management team is left with no option but to adopt a new name.
 In 2007, the park opens its doors under a new name: Walygator Parc.
 In 2010, the park opens a new roller coaster, "The Monster", an inverted roller coaster by Swiss manufacturer Bolliger & Mabillard. The ride had previously anchored Expoland in Japan, and is a clone of Raptor at Cedar Point.
In 2013, the park, once again on the verge of bankruptcy, is sold to a group of investors made of Jacqueline Lejeune, Franck Déglin and Francois-Jérôme Parent.
 In 2016, Jacqueline Lejeune and Franck Déglin sell Walygator Parc to Aspro Parks.
 In 2020, the park was renamed Walygator Grand-Est following the purchase of Walibi Sud-Ouest and renaming as Walygator Sud-Ouest.

Coasters

Other attractions

Water rides

Location
The park is located 15 km north of Metz, at 47.15984 N,2.988281 E.

It is served by the eponymous SNCF station.

External links

  official website of Walygator Park
  official website of Walygator Park in English

Amusement parks in France
Aspro Parks attractions
Buildings and structures in Moselle (department)
Tourist attractions in Moselle (department)
1989 establishments in France
Former Six Flags theme parks
Amusement parks opened in 1989
The Smurfs in amusement parks